Richard Brook may refer to:

Richard Brook (chief executive), chief executive of the UK charity Sense-National Deafblind and Rubella Association
Richard Brook (bishop) (1880–1969), Anglican bishop
Professor Moriarty

See also
Richard Brooke (disambiguation)
Richard Brooks (disambiguation)